Chucho is a given name. Notable people with the name include:

Chucho Avellanet (born 1941), Puerto Rican singer and comedic actor
Christian Benítez (1986–2013), Ecuadorian footballer nicknamed 'Chucho'
Chucho Castillo (born 1944), former Mexican boxer
Chucho Merchán (born 1953), session jazz bassist
Chucho Navarro, (1913–93), singer and founding member of the Trio Los Panchos
Chucho Ramos (1918–77), outfielder/first baseman in Major League Baseball during the 1944 season
Chucho Sanoja (1926–98), Venezuelan musician, pianist, composer, music director and arranger
Chucho Valdés (born 1941), Cuban pianist, bandleader, composer and arranger